A crisis took place in late March 1987 between Turkey and Greece as part of the Aegean dispute. Turkey learned that Greece was starting to drill for oil in the Aegean Sea in the vicinity of Thasos, a Greek territory. In response, the Turkish survey ship Piri Reis (and later the RV MTA Sismik 1) was sent to the area with an escort of Turkish warships.

Background
Oil was discovered off Thasos, in 1973. Greece claimed ownership of mineral rights in the continental shelf extending from beneath all its islands in the Aegean. Turkey proposed that the continental shelf be divided through negotiations.

Events

The crisis escalated, armed forces of both countries were on alert, and each side said they would use force if obstructed by the other. The incident nearly started a war between Greece and Turkey. 

Greek prime minister Andreas Papandreou gave the orders to sink the ship if it was found in Greek waters. Turkish Prime Minister Turgut Özal said that "If Greece interferes with our vessel in any way, and this is what Papandreou is saying, we will act in the same way against him", "As a result, it could be cause for war," but he also added that "We are waiting for the first move from them." The Greek foreign minister Karolos Papoulias was sent to Bulgaria (then a member of the Warsaw Pact) for discussions. The Greek government gave orders for the suspension of operation of the base of NATO in Nea Makri, while the Greek forces and Navy were alarmed.

Britain's Lord Carrington, the secretary general of NATO, urged Greece and Turkey to avoid the use of force and offered to act as a mediator.

See also 

 Greek–Turkish relations

References 

Greece–Turkey relations
1987 in Turkey
1987 in Greece
Conflicts in 1987
International maritime incidents
Andreas Papandreou